NewHorizon, a trade publication, is a quarterly English-language magazine owned by the Institution of Islamic Banking and Insurance (IIBI) and published in the United Kingdom. From December 2012 it went on online.

History and profile
NewHorizon was founded in 1991. The magazine is based in London. It covers Islamic finance and insurance globally. Articles span topics such as new regulations, products and services, and the launch of new Sharia-compliant financial institutions. It also provides analysis on areas such as retail banking, capital markets, sukuk, takaful and retakaful, structuring the derivatives in accordance with Sharia- principles, credit risk management, qard hasan microfinance, Islamic funds and their management.

References

External links
 Official website

1991 establishments in the United Kingdom
2012 disestablishments in the United Kingdom
Business magazines published in the United Kingdom
Defunct magazines published in the United Kingdom
Magazines established in 1991
Magazines disestablished in 2012
Magazines published in London
Online magazines with defunct print editions
Online magazines published in the United Kingdom
Professional and trade magazines
Quarterly magazines published in the United Kingdom